Rojin Thomas is an Indian film director and script writer who works in the Malayalam film industry. He made his directional debut with Philips and the Monkey Pen (2013), directed along with Shanil Muhammed. His second film was Jo and the Boy (2015). His third film Home (2021) received widespread critical attention.

Philips and the Monkey Pen won three awards at 2013 Kerala State Film Awards for Best Children's Film, Best Child Artist (Master Sanoop) and Best Children's Film Director.

Jo and the Boy won two awards at 2015 Kerala State Film Awards for Best Choreography (Sreejith) and Best Costume Designer (Nissar).

Short films

Films

References

External links

Living people
Film directors from Thiruvananthapuram
Malayalam film directors
1992 births
Malayalam screenwriters
21st-century Indian film directors
Screenwriters from Thiruvananthapuram